Mazhanoolkkanavu or Mazhanool Kanav (മഴനൂല്‍ക്കനവ്‌) is a Malayalam language film. It was released in 2003.

Synopsis
Varsha, a teacher, struggles to lead a normal life as she is haunted by memories of her lost love, Unni. However, her straightforward behavior earns her the ire of her students and colleagues.

Cast
Vineeth as Jithu
Augustine
 Charulatha as Varsha Menon
 Mamukkoya as Hassan 
 Paravoor Bharathan 
 Subair as Rasheed
 Spadikam George 
 Jagathy Sreekumar as Nair
 Narendra Prasad

References

External links
 

2003 films
2000s Malayalam-language films